The Inland Revenue Ordinance is one of Hong Kong's Ordinances. It regulates the inland revenue of Hong Kong.

Most commonly used sections

Interpretation 
IRO Section.2 Interpretation of some terms using in the ordinance.

Property tax
IRO Section.5 Charge of property tax

IRO Section.5B Ascertainment of assessable value

IRO Section.7C Rental Bad debts (irrecoverable & recovered)

Salaries tax
IRO Section.8 Charge of salaries tax

IRO Section.9 Definition of income from employment

Profit tax
IRD Rules 5  Charge of Profit tax in respect of non-resident

IRO Section.14 Charge of profits tax

IRO Section.15 Certain amounts deemed trading receipts

IRO Section.16 Ascertainment of chargeable profits

IRO Section.17 Deductions not allowed

Tax computation
IRO Section.18 Basis for computing profits

IRO Section.18F Adjustment of assessable profits

IRO Section.19 Treatment of losses

IRO Section.20 Liability of certain non-resident persons

IRO Section.20A Consignment Tax

IRO Section.22 Assessment of partnerships

IRO Section.24 Clubs, trade associations, etc.

IRO Section.25 Deduction of property tax from profits tax
 Any person's HK property tax payable can be set off by the same HK profit tax payable.

IRO Section.26A Exclusion of certain profits from tax

IRO Section.26B Concessionary deductions, general provisions

IRO Section.26C Approved charitable donations

IRO Section.26D Elderly residential care expenses

IRO Section.26E Home loan interest

IRO Section.26G Contributions to recognized retirement schemes

IRO Section.27 Allowances, general provisions

IRO Section.28 Basic allowance

IRO Section.29 Married person's allowance

IRO Section.30 Dependent parent allowance

IRO Section.31 Child allowance

IRO Section.32 Single parent allowance

IRO Section.34 Initial and annual allowances, industrial buildings and structures

IRO Section.35 Balancing allowances and charges, buildings and structures

IRO Section.37 Initial and annual allowances, machinery or plant

IRO Section.38 Balancing allowances and charges, machinery or plant

IRO Section.41 Election for personal assessment

Tax administration
IRO Section.51 Returns and information to be furnished

IRO Section.51C Business records to be kept

IRO Section.51D Rent records to be kept

IRO Section.56A Joint owners and co-owners

IRO Section.88 Exemption of charitable bodies

IRO Section.88A Advance rulings

See also
List of Hong Kong legislation

External links
 Inland Revenue Ordinance Cap.112 (online)

Taxation in Hong Kong
Hong Kong legislation